Gar County, formerly Senge Tsangpo County, is a district (county) in the Ngari Prefecture of the western Tibet Autonomous Region of China. The main town is Shiquanhe, also called "Gar", on account of being the county seat, and "Ali", on account of being the seat of Ngari Prefecture.

Geography 
Main rivers in the county include Sênggê Zangbo and Gar Zangbo.

Transport 
China National Highway 219

Notes

References

External links
 Gar County, OpenStreetMap, retrieved 18 September 2022.

Counties of Tibet
Ngari Prefecture